Gerbillinae is one of the subfamilies of the rodent family Muridae and includes the gerbils, jirds, and sand rats.  Once known as desert rats, the subfamily includes about 110 species of African, Indian, and Asian rodents, including sand rats and jirds, all of which are adapted to arid habitats. Most are primarily active during the day, making them diurnal (but some species, including the common household pet, exhibit crepuscular behavior), and almost all are omnivorous. 

The gerbil got its name as a diminutive form of "jerboa", an unrelated group of rodents occupying a similar ecological niche.

One species, the Mongolian gerbil (Meriones unguiculatus), also known as the clawed jird, is a gentle and hardy animal that has become a popular small house pet. It is also used in some scientific research.

Classification
SUBFAMILY GERBILLINAE
Tribe Ammodillini
Genus Ammodillus
Ammodile, Ammodillus imbellis
Tribe Desmodilliscini
Genus Desmodilliscus
Pouched gerbil, Desmodilliscus braueri
Genus Pachyuromys
Fat-tailed gerbil, Pachyuromys duprasi
Tribe Gerbillini
Subtribe Gerbillina
Genus Dipodillus
Botta's gerbil, Dipodillus bottai
North African gerbil, Dipodillus campestris
Wagner's gerbil, Dipodillus dasyurus
Harwood's gerbil, Dipodillus harwoodi
James's gerbil, Dipodillus jamesi
Lowe's gerbil, Dipodillus lowei
Mackilligin's gerbil, Dipodillus mackilligini
Greater short-tailed gerbil, Dipodillus maghrebi
Rupicolous gerbil, Dipodillus rupicola
Lesser short-tailed gerbil, Dipodillus simoni
Somalian gerbil, Dipodillus somalicus
Khartoum gerbil, Dipodillus stigmonyx
Kerkennah Islands gerbil, Dipodillus zakariai
Genus Gerbillus
Subgenus Hendecapleura
Pleasant gerbil, Gerbillus amoenus
Brockman's gerbil, Gerbillus brockmani
Black-tufted gerbil, Gerbillus famulus
Algerian gerbil, Gerbillus garamantis
Grobben's gerbil, Gerbillus grobbeni
Pygmy gerbil, Gerbillus henleyi
Mauritanian gerbil, Gerbillus mauritaniae (sometimes considered a separate genus Monodia)
Harrison's gerbil, Gerbillus mesopotamiae
Darfur gerbil, Gerbillus muriculus
Balochistan gerbil, Gerbillus nanus
Large Aden gerbil, Gerbillus poecilops
Principal gerbil, Gerbillus principulus
Least gerbil, Gerbillus pusillus
Sand gerbil, Gerbillus syrticus
Waters's gerbil, Gerbillus watersi
Subgenus Gerbillus
Berbera gerbil, Gerbillus acticola
Agag gerbil, Gerbillus agag
Anderson's gerbil, Gerbillus andersoni
Swarthy gerbil, Gerbillus aquilus
Burton's gerbil, Gerbillus burtoni
Cheesman's gerbil, Gerbillus cheesmani
Dongola gerbil, Gerbillus dongolanus
Somalia gerbil, Gerbillus dunni
Flower's gerbil, Gerbillus floweri
Lesser Egyptian gerbil, Gerbillus gerbillus
Indian hairy-footed gerbil, Gerbillus gleadowi
Western gerbil, Gergbillus hesperinus
Hoogstraal's gerbil, Gerbillus hoogstraali
Lataste's gerbil, Gerbillus latastei
Sudan gerbil, Gerbillus nancillus
Nigerian gerbil, Gerbillus nigeriae
Occidental gerbil, Gerbillus occiduus
Pale gerbil, Gerbillus perpallidus
Cushioned gerbil, Gerbillus pulvinatus
Greater Egyptian gerbil, Gerbillus pyramidum
Rosalinda gerbil, Gerbillus rosalinda
Tarabul's gerbil, Gerbillus tarabuli
Genus Microdillus
Somali pygmy gerbil, Microdillus peeli
Subtribe Rhombomyina
Genus Brachiones
Przewalski's gerbil, Brachiones przewalskii
Genus Meriones
Subgenus Meriones
Tamarisk jird, Meriones tamariscinus
Subgenus Parameriones
Persian jird, Meriones persicus
King jird, Meriones rex
Subgenus Pallasiomys
Arabian jird, Meriones arimalius
Cheng's jird, Meriones chengi
Sundevall's jird, Meriones crassus
Dahl's jird, Meriones dahli
Moroccan jird, Meriones grandis
Libyan jird, Meriones libycus
Midday jird, Meriones meridianus
Buxton's jird, Meriones sacramenti
Shaw's jird, Meriones shawi
Tristram's jird, Meriones tristrami
Mongolian jird (Mongolian Gerbil), Meriones unguiculatus
Vinogradov's jird, Meriones vinogradovi
Zarudny's jird, Meriones zarudnyi
Subgenus Cheliones
Indian desert jird, Meriones hurrianae
Genus Psammomys
Fat sand rat, Psammomys obesus
Thin sand rat, Psammomys vexillaris
Genus Rhombomys
Great gerbil, Rhombomys opimus
Incertae sedis
Genus Sekeetamys
Bushy-tailed jird, Sekeetamys calurus
Tribe Gerbillurini
Genus Desmodillus
Cape short-eared gerbil, Desmodillus auricularis
Genus Gerbilliscus
Cape gerbil, Gerbilliscus afra
Boehm's gerbil, Gerbilliscus boehmi
Highveld gerbil, Gerbilliscus brantsii
Guinean gerbil, Gerbilliscus guineae
Gorongoza gerbil, Gerbilliscus inclusus
Kemp's gerbil, Gerbilliscus kempi
Bushveld gerbil, Gerbilliscus leucogaster
Black-tailed gerbil, Gerbilliscus nigricaudus
Phillips's gerbil, Gerbilliscus phillipsi
Fringe-tailed gerbil, Gerbilliscus robustus
Savanna gerbil, Gerbilliscus validus
Genus Gerbillurus
Hairy-footed gerbil, Gerbillurus paeba
Namib brush-tailed gerbil, Gerbillurus setzeri
Dune hairy-footed gerbil, Gerbillurus tytonis
Bushy-tailed hairy-footed gerbil, Gerbillurus vallinus
Genus Tatera
Indian gerbil, Tatera indica
Tribe Taterillini
Genus Taterillus
Robbins's tateril, Taterillus arenarius
Congo gerbil, Taterillus congicus
Emin's gerbil, Taterillus emini
Gracile tateril, Taterillus gracilis
Harrington's gerbil, Taterillus harringtoni
Lake Chad gerbil, Taterillus lacustris
Petter's gerbil, Taterillus petteri
Senegal gerbil, Taterillus pygargus
Tranieri's tateril, Taterillus tranieri

References

Citations

Resources
 CMDC C111 "Normative Biology Diseases Gerbils"—Division of Comparative Medicine, Office of Research & Innovation, University of South Florida
 McKenna, M. C. and S. K. Bell. 1997. Classification of Mammals above the Species Level. Columbia University Press, New York.
 Musser, G. G. and M. D. Carleton. 1993. "Family Muridae".  pp. 501–755 in Mammal Species of the World a Taxonomic and Geographic Reference. D. E. Wilson and D. M. Reeder, eds. Smithsonian Institution Press, Washington, D.C.
 Nowak, R. M. 1999. Walker's Mammals of the World, Vol. 2. Johns Hopkins University Press, London.
 Pavlinov, I. Ya., Yu. A. Dubrovskiy, O. L. Rossolimo, E. G. Potapova. 1990. Gerbils of the World. Nauka, Moscow.

 
Mammal subfamilies
Taxa named by John Edward Gray